Franklin W. Holgate, Sr. was an American politician. He served as a Democratic member of the Massachusetts House of Representatives from 1965 to 1971. During his time in office he participated in several organizations, including the Boston chapter of the NAACP, the local Chamber of Commerce, and the Citizens Urban Renewal Action Committee. He was a director of the Unity Bank & Trust Company. After his time in office he founded a scholarship fund in his name.

See also
 1967–1968 Massachusetts legislature

References

Democratic Party members of the Massachusetts House of Representatives
African-American state legislators in Massachusetts
1929 births
Year of death missing
21st-century African-American people